Polynucleobacter acidiphobus is an aerobic, chemo-organotrophic, catalase- and oxidase-positive, nonmotile bacterium of the genus Polynucleobacter. The type strain was isolated from a rock pool which was filled with fresh water in a mountain brook in Corsica in France.

References

External links
Type strain of Polynucleobacter acidiphobus at BacDive -  the Bacterial Diversity Metadatabase

Burkholderiaceae
Bacteria described in 2011